Ross Hall was a historic colonial farmhouse located on River Road in Piscataway, New Jersey. It was built  by Edward Antill and is also known as the Edward Antill House. In 1768, it was purchased by its namesake, Dr. Alexander Ross.

In early July 1778, it was the headquarters for General George Washington when he ordered a feu de joie for the second anniversary of the signing of the Declaration of Independence.

History

In 1688, Edward Antill, Esq. acquired several hundred acres near Raritan Landing. His son, Edward Antill (1701–1770), inherited the 370-acre property and built a house here for his family. On June 10, 1739, he married Anne Morris, daughter of Lewis Morris, Royal Governor of New Jersey. Their first child, Sarah, was born here on August 18, 1740. From these events, the house is dated as either late 1739 or early 1740. The other daughter of Morris married Anthony White, who built the nearby Buccleuch Mansion, across the Raritan River, .

Antill extensively farmed his property. He had a large apple orchard of 500 trees. The apples were then used for making cider at his distillery.

The property was sold in 1768 to Dr. Alexander Ross (1723–1775), after whom the house is now known. On February 11, 1775, he married Sarah Farmar. He died shortly after their marriage on November 30, 1775. She later married his assistant, Dr. Charles A. Howard, on August 5, 1778.

The house was next purchased by Miles Smith in 1792. In 1880, George W. Metlar bought the property. He also owned the nearby Ivy Hall, now known as the Cornelius Low House. After 1897, Ross Hall was used as the clubhouse for the New Brunswick Golf Club until 1925.

Metlar sold Ross Hall in the 1920s. Rutgers University owned it in the 1950s. It was damaged by fire in 1954 and destroyed in 1957.

Architecture
Ross Hall was a two-story brick house with a stone foundation and a gambrel roof. It was a blend of Georgian and Dutch colonial farmhouse styles.

Washington headquarters
The Battle of Monmouth was fought on June 28, 1778 in extreme heat, with many deaths due to heat stroke. After the battle, General George Washington and the Continental Army marched north to the Raritan River by New Brunswick for cool, fresh water. The army camped on both sides of the river. Washington made his headquarters at Ross Hall, the home of the widow Ross.

Independence Day parade

From his headquarters, Washington ordered a celebration with a feu de joie for the second anniversary of the signing of the Declaration of Independence:

The next day, Washington issued more detailed orders for the celebration:

A gentleman at camp reported on this celebration:

Legacy

Ross Hall Boulevard in Piscataway is named after the property.

An interior, parlor wall of Ross Hall has been preserved and will be displayed in an educational wing at the nearby Metlar-Bodine House Museum.

On July 4, 1976, a memorial stone was dedicated at the intersection of River Road and Sutphen Road to mark the first Independence Day parade in 1778.

See also
Edward Antill (1701–1770)
List of Washington's Headquarters during the Revolutionary War

References

External links

Piscataway, New Jersey
Houses completed in 1739
New Jersey in the American Revolution
Historic American Buildings Survey in New Jersey
1739 establishments in New Jersey